Woman representation in Mongolian Parliament, The State Great Khural, has constantly increased over the years since country's first democratic election in 1992. 17.1% percent (13 out of 76 seats) of the parliament are women as of 2016, which is the highest among seven parliamentary elections in Mongolia. However, it is still lower than regional average 19.7% and world average 23.4%. According to Inter-Parliamentary Union, Mongolia ranks at 115th together with Gabon (193 countries are classified by descending order of the percentage of women in the lower or single House). 
Mongolian female MPs have tradition of working under unofficial parliamentary group. Elected female members in 2016 (12 of 13 female MP are from MPP and one is from DP) agreed to unofficially work as a team on social security issues related to children, women and families.

Records

Legal Basis

Article 126 of Law on Election sets a quota for women candidacy. The revised electoral law obliges parties to include at least 20 per cent of women candidates.

Article 126.2 states that at least 20 percent of candidates nominated by a party or coalition shall be represented by one gender. This article was amended on May 5, 2016, by law.

Women Parliamentarians elected for 2020-2024 Parliamentary Election of Mongolia
This year a total of 13 women parliamentarians elected, and four are re-elected from the previous election.

Historic representation

2016 election 
In the 2016 parliamentary election, 13 women were elected from 151 women candidates (25.9 percent of the total candidates), representing 49 constituencies from 76 constituencies.

Before the 2016 election, the parliamentary law reduced the women quota from 30 percent to 20 percent and moved from proportional representation to the majoritarian system.

A total of 12 political parties and 3 coalitions all obliged the 20 percent of the women quota. Although all parties and coalition nominated more than the quota on women candidates, the main two parties, the Mongolian People's Party and Mongolian Democratic Party, all 13 women parliamentarians were from either party.

Women Parliamentarians 2016-2020 of Mongolia

2012 election 
The election law was amended at the end of 2011 moved from majoritarian system to a "mixed member proportional system" with the quota of 20% for women candidates.

In the 2012 Parliamentary election a total of 11 women parliamentarians were elected from 174 female candidates in the election, representing 32% (highest number of candidates) of total candidates.

Women Parliamentarians of 2012-2016 Parliament

2008 election 
The number reduced to only 3 women parliamentarian and 4% of total parliament.

The Mongolian People's Revolutionary Party changed its name to Mongolian People's Party in 2010.

Women Parliamentarians of 2008-2012 Parliament

2004 election 
The parliamentary election of 2004 only 5 women were elected out of 40 candidates, 16.4% of the total candidates.

Women Parliamentarians of 2004-2008 Parliament

2000 election 
In the 2000 parliamentary election 9 women, 8 were from the Mongolian People's Revolutionary Party and Oyun Sanjaasuren from the Civil Will Party-Mongolian Green Party.

Women Parliamentarians of 2000-2004 Parliament

1996 election 
There were 8 women parliamentarian members from 1996 to 2000.

When the Zorig Sanjaasuren murdered in 1998, Oyun Sanjaasuren entered politics and win the by-election in her brother's constituency.

Enkhtuya Oidov have established women parliamentarians committee and started initiatives to work closely with women civil society organisations.

1992 election 
In 1992 election total of 9 parties and one coalition joined the election. One of the women parliamentarians, Byambajav Janlav have left the Parliament to join the Supreme Court of Mongolia, highest court in Mongolia in 1995 before the term ended.

Women Parliamentarians of 1992-1996 Parliament

References

External links 
 Inter-Parliamentary Union

Parliament
State Great Khural
Mongolian Parliament